Pseudepimolis is a genus of moths in the family Erebidae. It was erected by Benoît Vincent and Michel Laguerre in 2013.

Species
Pseudepimolis apiciplaga (Rothschild, 1909)
Pseudepimolis haemasticta (Dognin, 1906)
Pseudepimolis incisa (Rothschild, 1909)
Pseudepimolis marpessa (Druce, 1906)
Pseudepimolis rhyssa (Druce, 1906)
Pseudepimolis ridenda (Dognin, 1911)

References

Phaegopterina
Moth genera